Shaw Han-yi is a Taiwanese academic and research fellow at the National Chengchi University.

Selected works
In a statistical overview derived from writings by and about Han-yi Shaw, OCLC/WorldCat lists only 1 work in 1 language and 52 library holdings.

 The Diaoyutai/Senkaku Islands Dispute: Its History and an Analysis of the Bases of Claims of the P.R.C., R.O.C., and Japan (1997)
  The Diaoyutai/Senkaku Islands Dispute: Its History and an Analysis of the Ownership Claims of the PRC, ROC, and Japan (1999)

Notes

Living people
Taiwanese academics
Year of birth missing (living people)
Academic staff of the National Chengchi University